Escapades is the debut studio solo album by French electronic musician Gaspard Augé, half of the French electronic duo Justice. It was released on 25 June 2021 by Ed Banger Records through Genesis (Because Music). It was recorded in Paris alongside French producer Victor le Masne, taking only 2 months to complete. Video shorts were released for the singles "Force Majeure", "Hey!", "Captain", and "Belladone", as well as for the song "Pentacle". The album's lead single "Force Majeure" was selected as the official BBC broadcast soundtrack for UEFA Euro 2020.

Background

In an interview with NME, Augé described the project as a means for him to explore and develop music he backlogged over the years: "I had a vast amount of melodies and arrangement ideas for years and just took the opportunity to do my own thing." He further explains that the album incorporates musical and film score elements from the 60's, 70's and 80's, touching on themes ranging from Italian horror to psychedelic folk "and every conceivable point between". He adds that the album's orchestral qualities and lack of lyrics hopefully "stimulates the imagination." Indeed, part of Augé's inspiration to produce the record lied in his frustration with the musical industry's adherence to simplistic and codified structure in modern musical releases, "Everything seems so controlled and minimal; as soon as you put too many notes it’s seen as not right." Overall, the album explores notions of escapism from standardized creative expression, with the goal of reorienting the listener toward a more expansive and diverse creative process, alongside an augmented sense experience.

Critical reception

Escapades received generally positive reviews from music critics. Metacritic, which assigns a normalised rating out of 100 to reviews from mainstream publications, gives the album an average score of 73, based on 6 reviews. A review by Pitchfork describes its melodies as "excellent," with every element "primed for enormity — a sandwich packed with hefty slabs of prime rib, rather than the sensory overload of experimental modern cooking." Ben Devlin of musicOMH describes the album as "captivating in all its eccentricities, evocative and groovy in equal measure", and that "with this album Augé well and truly proves himself as an artist in his own right." Damian Jones from NME reflects in a 3/5 review that "Augé’s thirst for the strange makes this album an odd but interesting solo proposition, which still makes some room for dancefloor slayers", while noting that the lead single "admittedly could have easily slotted into any Justice record with its trademark industrial synth jabs and propulsive beats." Uncut described the album as having "extremely polished music that sometimes strays a little into fromage [...] but where it works, it can sweep you off your feet."

Track listing

Personnel
Credits adapted from AllMusic.

Musicians
 Gaspard Augé - keyboard; production, arrangement, composition 
 Victor le Masne - drums, keyboard, piano; production, arrangement, composition 
 Xavier Le Masne - flute 
 Laura Etchegoyhen – chorus , vocals 
 Audrey Thirot - chorus 
 Elena Azevedo Da Silva - chorus 
 Sibylle Chalamon – chorus 

Technical
 Michael Declerck - production, engineering, mixing 
 Antoine Poyeton - engineering, recording
 Louis Bes - recording
 Louis Gallet - recording
 Mike Bell - mastering

Artwork
 Filip Nilsson - art direction
 Thomas Jumin - artwork
 Adrien Blanchat - sleeve art
 Jasper J. Spanning - photography
 Marina Monge - costume design

Other
 Marie Pieprzownik - lacquer cut

Charts

Release history

Notes

References

External links

2021 debut albums
Electropop albums
Ed Banger Records albums
French-language albums